Robert Mascall (or Maschal) (died 22 December 1416) was a medieval Carmelite friar who served as the Bishop of Hereford from 1404 to 1416.

Mascall was born at Ludlow, Shropshire, where at an early age he became a Carmelite friar. He was educated at the University of Oxford, gaining a distinction in philosophy and theology. Probably in 1400, King Henry IV appointed Mascall his confessor.

Mascall was appointed the Bishop of the Diocese of Hereford by papal provision on 2 July and consecrated on 6 July 1404. He received possession of the temporalities of the See of Hereford on 25 September 1404.

Mascall died in office on 22 December 1416.

Citations

References

 
 
 

Year of birth unknown
1416 deaths
15th-century English Roman Catholic bishops
Bishops of Hereford
People from Ludlow
Clergy from Shropshire